The men's doubles tournament at the 1980 French Open was held from 26 May to 8 June 1980 on the outdoor clay courts at the Stade Roland Garros in Paris, France. Victor Amaya and Hank Pfister won the title, defeating Brian Gottfried and Raúl Ramírez in the final.

Seeds

Draw

Finals

Top half

Section 1

Section 2

Bottom half

Section 3

Section 4

External links
 Association of Tennis Professionals (ATP) – main draw
1980 French Open – Men's draws and results at the International Tennis Federation

Men's Doubles
French Open by year – Men's doubles